Moqut Ruffins (April 6, 1984 – August 16, 2022) was an American football offensive lineman. He played college football at Louisiana Tech University. He has also been a member of the Lakeland Thunderbolts, Laredo Lobos, Lubbock Renegades, Bossier–Shreveport Battle Wings, New Orleans VooDoo, Pittsburgh Power, San Antonio Talons and Washington Valor.

Early years
Ruffins was born in Monterey, California. He played high school football at Middletown High School South in Middletown Township, New Jersey and helped the team win Central Jersey Group 3 titles in 2000 and 2001.

College career
Ruffins played for the Louisiana Tech Bulldogs from 2002 to 2005. He accumulated career totals of 79 tackles, nine tackles for a loss and three sacks. He earned First Team All-WAC honors his senior season in 2005 after recording 38 tackles, seven tackles for a loss, three sacks and two forced fumbles. Ruffins was named the WAC Defensive Player of the Week in October 2005 after sacking quarterback Colt Brennan twice and recovering a fumble in a 46–14 win over the Hawaii Rainbow Warriors.

Professional career

Lakeland Thunderbolts
Ruffins played for the Lakeland Thunderbolts of the National Indoor Football League in 2006.

Laredo Lobos
Ruffins played in one game for the Laredo Lobos of the af2 in 2007.

Lubbock Renegades
Ruffins was assigned to the Lubbock Renegades of the af2 on April 27, 2007. He played in nine games for the Renegades during the 2007 season, recording ten tackles, a sack, three pass breakups, two forced fumbles and a blocked kick. He was assigned to the Renegades on December 12, 2007 and played for the team in 2008.

Bossier–Shreveport Battle Wings
Ruffins played for the Bossier–Shreveport Battle Wings of the af2 in 2009, earning First Team National Conference All-af2 honors. The Battle Wings moved to the AFL in 2010, where Ruffins recorded fourteen total tackles, one forced fumble and seven receptions for 54 yards and two touchdowns.

New Orleans VooDoo
Ruffins was assigned to the New Orleans VooDoo on September 23, 2010. He caught four passes for 39 yards and two touchdowns for the VooDoo during the 2011 season.

Pittsburgh Power
Ruffins was assigned to the Pittsburgh Power on January 30, 2012. He recorded five receptions for 41 yards and two touchdowns for the Power in 2012.

San Antonio Talons
Ruffins was assigned to the San Antonio Talons on January 10, 2013. He caught sixteen passes for 181 yards and five touchdowns in seventeen games for the Talons during the 2013 season. He accumulated nineteen receptions for 151 yards and five touchdowns in sixteen games for the team in 2014.

Jacksonville Sharks
Ruffins was assigned to the Jacksonville Sharks on March 5, 2015. He earned First Team All-Arena honors in 2015 after starting sixteen games on the offensive line of the Sharks and catching seven passes for 71 yards and three touchdowns. He played in 15 games, all starts, in 2016, catching 5 passes for 65 yards and 2 touchdowns. On March 6, 2017, Ruffins signed with the Sharks for the 2017 season. He earned First Team All-NAL honors in 2017 after playing in 8 games and catching 3 passes for 54 yards and 1 touchdown. On August 18, 2017, he signed with the Sharks for the 2018 season.

Washington Valor
On October 14, 2016, Ruffins was selected by the Washington Valor during the dispersal draft.

Albany Empire
On June 7, 2018, Ruffins was assigned to the Albany Empire. On March 7, 2019, Ruffins was assigned to the Empire.

Death
Ruffins died on August 16, 2022, at the age of 38.

References

External links
Just Sports Stats
College stats

1984 births
2022 deaths
Albany Empire (AFL) players
American football offensive linemen
American football defensive linemen
African-American players of American football
Louisiana Tech Bulldogs football players
Lakeland Thunderbolts players
Laredo Lobos players
Lubbock Renegades players
Bossier–Shreveport Battle Wings players
New Orleans VooDoo players
Pittsburgh Power players
San Antonio Talons players
Jacksonville Sharks players
Washington Valor players
Middletown High School South alumni
Players of American football from California
Players of American football from New Jersey
People from Middletown Township, New Jersey
Sportspeople from Monterey, California
Sportspeople from Monmouth County, New Jersey
21st-century African-American sportspeople
20th-century African-American people